Walewska Moreira de Oliveira (born 1 October 1979 in Belo Horizonte) is a female volleyball player who has competed for Brazil   in three consecutive Summer Olympics, starting in 2000. She won a bronze medal with the women's national team in Sydney, Australia, and a gold medal in the 2008 Olympics in Beijing. Walewska also claimed the gold medal at the 1999 Pan American Games.

Clubs
  MRV-Sugar/Minas (1997-1998)
  Rexona (1998-2003)
  Açucar União/São Caetano (2003-2004)
  Sirio Perugia (2004-2007)
  Grupo 2002 Murcia (2007-2008)
  VC Zarechie Odintsovo (2008-2011)
  Vôlei Futuro (2011-2012)
  Vôlei Amil (2012-2014)
  Minas Tênis Clube (2014-2015)
  Praia Clube (2015–2018)
  Osasco Audax (2018–2019)
  Praia Clube (2019–2022)

Awards

Individuals
 2007 South American Championship – "Best Server" 
 2008 FIVB World Grand Prix – "Best Blocker"
 2015–16 Brazilian Superliga – "Best Spiker"
 2017 South American Club Championship – "Best Middle Blocker"

Clubs
 1999–00 Brazilian Superliga –  Champion, with Rexona
 2004–05 Italian League –  Runner-up, with Pallavolo Sirio Perugia
 2005–06 CEV Champions League –  Champion, with Pallavolo Sirio Perugia
 2006–07 Italian League –  Champion, with Pallavolo Sirio Perugia
 2008–09 Russian Super League –  Runner-up, with Zarechye Odintsovo
 2009–10 Russian Super League –  Champion, with Zarechye Odintsovo
 2015–16 Brazilian Superliga –  Runner-up, with Dentil Praia Clube
 2017–18 Brazilian Superliga –  Champion, with Dentil Praia Clube
 2020–21 Brazilian Superliga –  Runner-up, with Dentil Praia Clube
 2021–22 Brazilian Superliga –  Runner-up, with Dentil Praia Clube
 2017 South American Club Championship –  Runner-up, with Dentil Praia Clube
 2020 South American Club Championship –  Runner-up, with Dentil Praia Clube
 2021 South American Club Championship –  Champion, with Dentil Praia Clube
 2022 South American Club Championship –  Runner-up, with Dentil Praia Clube

References

External links
 FIVB Biography

1979 births
Living people
Brazilian women's volleyball players
Volleyball players at the 2000 Summer Olympics
Volleyball players at the 2004 Summer Olympics
Volleyball players at the 2008 Summer Olympics
Volleyball players at the 1999 Pan American Games
Volleyball players at the 2007 Pan American Games
Olympic volleyball players of Brazil
Olympic gold medalists for Brazil
Olympic bronze medalists for Brazil
Sportspeople from Belo Horizonte
Brazilian people of Polish descent
Brazilian expatriate sportspeople in Spain
Olympic medalists in volleyball
Medalists at the 2008 Summer Olympics
Medalists at the 2000 Summer Olympics
Pan American Games gold medalists for Brazil
Expatriate volleyball players in Spain
Pan American Games medalists in volleyball
Expatriate volleyball players in Italy
Expatriate volleyball players in Russia
Brazilian expatriates in Italy
Brazilian expatriates in Russia
Medalists at the 1999 Pan American Games
Medalists at the 2007 Pan American Games
21st-century Brazilian women